Claire Mintzer Fagin FAAN (born November 25, 1926) is an American nurse, educator, academic, and consultant. She has a bachelor's degree in science from Wagner College, a master's in nursing from Columbia University and a Ph.D from New York University, all in New York City. Fagin’s major contributions to psychiatric nursing, nursing education and geriatric care were always underlined with a strong belief in the power of the activist consumer. As a result of her work to change hospital visiting policies, Fagin is considered to be one of the founders of family centered care and is the first woman to serve as president of an Ivy League university.

Biography
Fagin was the daughter of Mae and Harry Mintzer, immigrants to New York City. Her parents wished for her to become a medical doctor like her aunt, who was a dermatologist in Queens. She elected to study nursing at Wagner College and earned a doctorate at New York University. Her doctoral dissertation covered the concept of "rooming in" for parents of hospitalized children. She continued her research in this area, which influenced the perception of parental visitation in hospitals.

In 1970, she was hired by CUNY/ Lehman College Bronx, NY as Head of Nursing to create a Nursing Department that focused on Family Centered Nursing Care and also psychological care of every aspect in nursing care.  She left in 1977 to join the University of Pennsylvania as dean of the School of Nursing.

She served as Dean  from 1977 to 1991, when she left to do geriatric nursing research as a Scholar in Residence at the Institute of Medicine, National Academy of Sciences. She was Presidential Chair in early 1993 at the University of California, San Francisco.

In 1993 she was named interim president of the University of Pennsylvania (from July 1, 1993 to June 30, 1994), the first woman to serve in the capacity of a university president with any Ivy League university. She continued to focus on geriatric nursing after returning to the professoriate in 1994 and has done so ever since. In 2005 she completed five years as director of the "John A. Hartford Foundation Program: Building Academic Geriatric Nursing Capacity", which is coordinated in Washington, D.C., at the American Academy of Nursing. She is a past president of the American Orthopsychiatric Association.

She is Leadership Professor Emerita, Dean Emerita at the University of Pennsylvania and has received 15 honorary doctoral degrees as well as the prestigious Honorary Recognition Award of the American Nurses Association. On November 30, 2006, the nursing education building at the University of Pennsylvania was renamed Claire M. Fagin Hall.

She is an Honorary Fellow of the UK Royal College of Nursing, was inducted into the American Nurses Association Hall of Fame in 2010 and is a member of the National Academy of Medicine, the American Academy of Nursing, the Century Association and the American Academy of Arts and Sciences. She is currently emeritus on the Board of Trustees of the Visiting Nurse Service of New York.

Family
Fagin and her husband, Samuel Fagin, had two sons. One died of Covid in 2020. Samuel died on Christmas Eve 2019.

Works

See also
List of Living Legends of the American Academy of Nursing

References

Living people
American consultants
American nursing administrators
Teachers College, Columbia University alumni
Steinhardt School of Culture, Education, and Human Development alumni
Chief Administrators of the University of Pennsylvania
Honorary Fellows of the Royal College of Nursing
People in public health
1926 births
Nursing school deans
Nursing educators
20th-century women scientists
American academic administrators
Women heads of universities and colleges
Members of the National Academy of Medicine